Au am Rhein is a municipality in the district of Rastatt in Baden-Württemberg in Germany.

Mayor
Since 2017: Veronika Laukart
From 1985 to 2017: Hartwig Rihm (born 1949) (CDU). He was reelected in 1993, 2001 and 2009.

References

Rastatt (district)